The broad-striped Malagasy mongoose or broad-striped vontsira (Galidictis fasciata) is a species of Galidiinae, a subfamily of mongoose-like euplerids native to Madagascar. The species contains two known subspecies: Galidictis fasciata fasciata and Galidictis fasciata striata.

Their main distinguishing factors are their stripes and their tails; G. f. fasciata has a fuller, reddish-brown tail and 8-10 stripes, while G. f. striata has a thinner, white tail and 5 stripes. They are all forest-dweller on the eastern side of the island, and their primary prey is small rodents. This species is most active in the evening and at night.

The specific epithet fasciata means ‘banded’ in Latin. Its local common name is vontsira fotsy, ‘white vontsira’ in Malagasy.

References

Euplerids
Endemic fauna of Madagascar
Carnivorans of Africa
Mammals of Madagascar
Mammals described in 1788
Taxa named by Johann Friedrich Gmelin